Francesco Ricci may refer to:
 Francesco Ricci (mathematician), Italian economist and mathematician
 Francesco Pasquale Ricci (1732–1817), Italian composer and violinist
 Francesco Ricci (politician), Italian politician, former mayor of Chieti